Soldatskoye is a rural locality and the administrative center of Soldatsky Selsoviet Rural Settlement, Fatezhsky District, Kursk Oblast, Russia. Population:

Geography 
The village is located on the Usozha River (a left tributary of the Svapa in the basin of the Seym), 95 km from the Russia–Ukraine border, 49 km north-west of Kursk, 8 km west of the district center – the town Fatezh.

 Climate
Soldatskoye has a warm-summer humid continental climate (Dfb in the Köppen climate classification).

Transport 
Soldatskoye is located 5 km from the federal route  Crimea Highway as part of the European route E105, 2.5 km from the road of regional importance  (Fatezh – Dmitriyev), on the road of intermunicipal significance  (38K-038 – Soldatskoye – Shuklino), 27 km from the nearest railway halt 29 km (railway line Arbuzovo – Luzhki-Orlovskiye).

The rural locality is situated 52 km from Kursk Vostochny Airport, 168 km from Belgorod International Airport and 242 km from Voronezh Peter the Great Airport.

References

Notes

Sources

Rural localities in Fatezhsky District
Fatezhsky Uyezd